In Love with Alma Cogan is a 2011 British romantic comedy film written and directed by Tony Britten. It was filmed in and around the Pavilion Theatre, Cromer Pier, Norfolk, England.

Plot
The film revolves around, Norman, a world-weary manager of a pier theatre in a seaside resort. Norman has worked in the theatre for all of his life, but will not accept that the local council, which own the theatre, are planning to install more commercial management in an attempt to boost audience numbers. As the story unfolds he realises it may be time to move on and put behind him the ghost of 1950s and 1960s singer Alma Cogan, who had performed at the theatre many years before. Sandra, his devoted long-suffering assistant, and Norman decide to leave the theatre to fulfil her dream of being a professional singer and unexpectedly enjoy a late blossoming romance.

Cast
Roger Lloyd-Pack               - Norman
Niamh Cusack                   - Sandra
Gwyneth Strong                 - Laura
Neil McCaul                        - Eddie
Christian Brassington          - George
Keith Barron                   - Cedric
Simon Green                        - Julian
Gary Martin - Larry
Ann Firbank                    - Mrs. Craske
Terry Molloy                   - Barry Bates
Catrine Kirkman                    - Alma Collins
Daniel Bardwell                    - Young Norman
Tim Bell                           - Mr. Whipit
Kris Dillon Jr                     - Adonis
John Hurt                      - Master of Ceremonies
Tom Carver                         - Jack 'the Hat' McVitie

Awards
In March, 2012 at the Canada International Film Festival the film won an Award of Excellence.

References

External links
Capriol films - In Love with Alma Cogan

2011 films
2011 romantic comedy films
British romantic comedy films
Films set in Norfolk
Films shot in Norfolk
Cromer
2010s English-language films
2010s British films